Mikko Piitulainen (14 April 1878 in Impilahti – 18 October 1935) was a Finnish farmer, attorney and politician. He was a member of the Parliament of Finland from 1919 to 1922 and again from 1924 to 1927, representing the Agrarian League.

References

1878 births
1935 deaths
People from Pitkyarantsky District
People from Viipuri Province (Grand Duchy of Finland)
Centre Party (Finland) politicians
Members of the Parliament of Finland (1919–22)
Members of the Parliament of Finland (1924–27)